John Lambert (February 24, 1746February 4, 1823), was a New Jersey politician who served as a Representative, a U.S. Senator and as acting governor of New Jersey.

Early life 
Born in Amwell Township in the Province of New Jersey (in what is today known as Lambertville, New Jersey), he pursued an academic course and engaged in agricultural pursuits.

Politics 
Lambert was a member of the New Jersey General Assembly from 1780–1785, and in 1788. He was a member of the New Jersey Legislative Council from 1790–1804, and served as vice president from 1801 to 1804. Lambert was the Acting Governor of New Jersey in 1802 and 1803, serving in 1802 due to a deadlocked vote in the gubernatorial election. He was elected as a Democratic-Republican to the Ninth United States Congress and Tenth United States Congress, serving in office from March 4, 1805 to March 3, 1809. Lambert was elected to the United States Senate and served a single term, from March 4, 1809, to March 3, 1815. On June 17, 1812, he voted against war with Britain.

What is now the city of Lambertville, New Jersey was named in his honor in 1814 when the community's first post office was established.

Lambert owned and managed a plantation. He was an avid reader, and was known for owning one of the most esteemed libraries in Hunterdon County,

Death 
Lambert died near  Lambertville, and was interred in Barber's Burying Ground, Delaware Township, Hunterdon County, New Jersey.

References

External links

New Jersey Governor John Lambert, National Governors Association

Political Graveyard info for John Lambert

1746 births
1823 deaths
Members of the New Jersey Legislative Council
Members of the New Jersey General Assembly
People from Lambertville, New Jersey
United States senators from New Jersey
Democratic-Republican Party United States senators
Democratic-Republican Party members of the United States House of Representatives from New Jersey
Democratic-Republican Party state governors of the United States
People of colonial New Jersey
Burials in New Jersey
19th-century American politicians